is a Japanese manga series written and illustrated by Harold Sakuishi. It was serialized in Kodansha's seinen manga magazine Weekly Young Magazine from 1988 to 1993, with its chapters collected in 19 tankōbon volumes. It was adapted into a two-episode original video animation (OVA) animated by J.C.Staff in 1992. A sequel, titled Gorillaman, was serialized in Weekly Young Magazine from 2020 to 2022.

In 1990, Gorillaman won the 14th Kodansha Manga Award in the general category.

Media

Manga
Written and illustrated by Harold Sakuishi, Gorillaman was serialized in Kodansha's seinen manga magazine Weekly Young Magazine from 1988 to 1993. Kodansha collected its chapters in nineteen tankōbon volumes, released from April 6, 1989, to October 6, 1993.

For the magazine's 40th anniversary, Sakuishi launched a two-chapter story in Weekly Young Magazine, under the title Gorillaman 40, on October 12 and 17, 2020; it was later serialized in the same magazine from March 28 to August 22, 2022. Kodansha collected its chapters in three tankōbon volumes, released from April 6 to September 6, 2022; in the third volume it was announced that the series will have a "Family Arc" spin-off manga.

Original video animation
The series was adapted into a two-episode original video animation (OVA) animated by J.C.Staff, released on June 25 and December 24, 1992.

Reception
In 1990, alongside The Silent Service, Gorillaman won the 14th Kodansha Manga Award in the general category.

References

External links
 

Comedy anime and manga
J.C.Staff
Kodansha manga
Seinen manga
Winner of Kodansha Manga Award (General)